USS Signal is a name used more than once by the United States Navy, and may refer to:

 , an American Civil War gunboat in commission from 1862 to 1864, eventually burned and its crew captured.
 , a World War II tanker in commission from 1944 to 1946

United States Navy ship names